Paul K. Ryu (also known as Ryu Kichyun and Ki-chʻŏn Yu) is a South Korean-American legal scholar. Ryu served as the ninth president of Seoul National University and the sixth dean of Seoul National University School of Law.

Education
Ryu graduated from the University of Tokyo in 1943 and received his P.h.D. from Yale Law School in 1958.

Career
Ryu served as the sixth dean of Seoul National University Law School from July 1962 to August 1965. Through Ryu's leadership as SNU's Law School Dean, SNU's Graduate School of Law (today known as the Judicial Research and Training Institute) was established to directly connect the legal education at SNU Law School and the education for the members of the judiciary. On August 27, 1965, Ryu was named president of Seoul National University. .

Personal life
On January 3, 1959, Ryu married Helen Silving at the home of New York University's chancellor, George D. Stoddard. Silving and Ryu met while teaching at Harvard University.

Major publications
Paul K. Ryu, Helen Silving (1964). Nullum Crimen Sine Actu
Paul K. Ryu (2014).세계혁명(개정판)(양장본 HardCover)
Paul K. Ryu, Helen Silving. International Criminal Law — A Search for Meaning
Paul K. Ryu (1958). Causation in Criminal Law
Paul K. Ryu, Helen Silving. The Foundations of Democracy - Its Origins and Essential Ingredients
Paul K. Ryu, Helen Silving. ERROR JURIS: A COMPARATIVE STUDY.

References

1915 births
1998 deaths
Presidents of Seoul National University
University of Tokyo alumni
Yale Law School alumni
South Korean emigrants to the United States
South Korean legal scholars
Academic staff of Seoul National University